Albert Robbe (born 15 February 1916, date of death unknown) was a Belgian boxer. He competed in the 1936 Summer Olympics. In 1936, Robbe was eliminated in the second round of the heavyweight class after losing his fight to Ferenc Nagy of Hungary.

External links
 
 Albert Robbe's profile at Sports Reference.com

1916 births
Year of death missing
Heavyweight boxers
Olympic boxers of Belgium
Boxers at the 1936 Summer Olympics
Belgian male boxers